Chandra Bhan Prasad (born September 1958) is an Indian journalist, writer, activist and political commentator.

Life

In 2007-08 Prasad was a visiting scholar  at the Centre for the Advanced Study of India (CASI) at the University of Pennsylvania. He has been profiled by The New York Times and The Washington Post.

References

Further reading 

 An 'English goddess' for India's down-trodden
 Dalit entrepreneurship can change the community`s social status: Chandra Bhan Prasad
 For a new paradigm of social justice
 'Indian languages carry the legacy of caste'
 Dalit entrepreneurship can change the community's social status: Chandra Bhan Prasad
 D is for Dalits and E is for the English Goddess - Times of India

External links 

 

1958 births
Living people
Dalit writers
Indian businesspeople
Indian activists
20th-century Indian businesspeople
20th-century Buddhists
Indian Buddhists
21st-century Buddhists
21st-century Indian businesspeople